SMK Lembah Subang (also known as Subang Valley High School) is a coeducational secondary school, located in Petaling Jaya, Malaysia near Kelana Jaya that was established in 2004. It is situated close to the Sultan Abdul Aziz Shah Airport.

School identity
SMKLS is named after Lembah Subang, a road in Petaling Jaya.

Their motto is "Ilmu Asas Kecemerlangan" which means "Education is the key for success". The school's vision is "Menjadi Sekolah Berkesan Ke Arah Membentuk Murid Bestari" which translates as "An effective school producing smart students".

School song
Putra putri wawasan,
falsafah diamalkan,
jati insan seimbang,
bina bangsa gemilang.

Gagah gigih berjuang,
bimbingan yang berkesan,
jati diri dijuak,
kita warga perkasa.

Amal teguhkan iman,
berakhlak bertakwa,
restu ayah dan bonda,
berbakti berjasa.

Luhur budi pandai bijaksana,
pekerti mulia,
rajin usaha capai cita -cita,
kerana ilmu asas kecermelangan,
kerana ilmu asas kecermelangan.

School sport activity
There are four sport houses which comprises all students from Forms One through Five. The sport houses have no names and all the students just call each according to its colour :

-SMKLS Sport Houses 2009-

Schools in Selangor
Secondary schools in Malaysia